Geoffrey James may refer to:

 Geoffrey James (photographer) (born 1942), Canadian photographer
 Geoffrey James (journalist) (born 1953), American author of The Tao of Programming

See also
Jeffrey James (disambiguation)